Boris Dimovski (born 18 March 1943) is a Yugoslav wrestler. He competed in the men's freestyle 52 kg at the 1968 Summer Olympics.

References

External links
 

1943 births
Living people
Yugoslav male sport wrestlers
Olympic wrestlers of Yugoslavia
Wrestlers at the 1968 Summer Olympics
People from Zelenikovo Municipality